Gabriela Bravo Sanestanislao (born 1963) is a Spanish politician serving as Minister of Justice, Interior and Public Administration for the Valencian Community in the Second government of Ximo Puig.

References 

1963 births
Living people
Female justice ministers
21st-century Spanish women politicians
Members of the 10th Corts Valencianes
University of Valencia alumni
Independent politicians in Spain